Dichrorampha uralensis is a butterfly belonging to the family Tortricidae. The species was first described by Aleksandr Sergeievich Danilevsky in 1948.

References

Grapholitini